Credit Card Roulette is a game of chance where every party involved contributes their own credit or debit card into a hat or billfold. The waitress or waiter will choose at random the card which will pay the entire bill. Ordering appetizers of any kind is prohibited and would result in the wait staff receiving an additional 10% tip from the orderer. An alternative version of the game is played where the waiter or waitress pulls one card at a time and the last card picked pays the bill. (Known as the “Carter Fireball”)  In either scenario, a previous loser excluding their credit card from future roulettes is not allowed. It is generally accepted to tip a wait staff member no less than 22% for their participation in selecting a card.

History 
Although the game's origins are unknown, it has increased in popularity within the last 20 years. Some believe it was started by Matt Formica, a longtime risk averse gambler, who would put in five or six of his own credit cards, one of which was canceled, and offer the waiter a very large tip if he picked one of the cards that "worked". However, if he picked the canceled card the meal was free. A society column article about Jerry's game ran in the Morning Herald in Uniontown, Pennsylvania on June 8, 1960.

References 

 Patriot Ledger, South Shore MA,  March 20, 1998
 Morning Herald, Uniontown PA, June 8, 1960

Further reading 
 
 

Games of chance
Payment cards